Madera County, officially the County of Madera, is a county at the geographic center of the U.S. state of California. As of the 2020 census, the population was 156,255. The county seat is Madera.

Madera County comprises the Madera, CA Metropolitan Statistical Area, which is included in the Fresno-Madera, CA Combined Statistical Area. It is located in the eastern San Joaquin Valley and the central Sierra Nevada.

The southeasternmost part of Yosemite National Park is located in the county's northeast.

History and etymology 

Madera County was formed in 1893 from Fresno County during a special election held in Fresno on May 16, 1893. Citizens residing in the area that was to become Madera County voted 1,179 to 358 for separation from Fresno County and the establishment of Madera County.

Madera is the Spanish term for wood. The county derives its name from the town of Madera, named when the California Lumber Company built a log flume to carry lumber to the Central Pacific Railroad there in 1876.

The Madera County Sheriff's Department employed the first woman in California to die in the line of duty as a sworn law enforcement officer—Tulare native Lucille Helm (1914–1959). For 15 years, the Madera housewife and mother of four worked on call as a "matron" assisting with female transfers.

Geography 

Madera County is part of the Madera AVA wine region.

National protected areas
 Devils Postpile National Monument
 Inyo National Forest (part)
 Sierra National Forest (part)
 Yosemite National Park (part)

Demographics

2020 census

Note: the US Census treats Hispanic/Latino as an ethnic category. This table excludes Latinos from the racial categories and assigns them to a separate category. Hispanics/Latinos can be of any race.

2011

Places by population, race, and income

2010
The 2010 United States Census reported that Madera County had a population of 150,865. The racial makeup of Madera County was 94,456 (62.6%) White, 5,629 (3.7%) African American, 4,136 (2.7%) Native American, 2,802 (1.9%) Asian, 162 (0.1%) Pacific Islander, 37,380 (24.8%) from other races, and 6,300 (4.2%) from two or more races.  Hispanic or Latino of any race were 80,992 persons (53.7%).

2000

As of the census of 2000, there were 123,109 people in the county, organized into 36,155 households, and 28,598 families. The population density was 58 people per square mile (22/km2). There were 40,387 housing units at an average density of 19 per square mile (7/km2). The racial makeup of the county was 62.2% White, 4.1% Black or African American, 2.6% Native American, 1.3% Asian, 0.2% Pacific Islander, 24.4% from other races, and 5.2% from two or more races. 44.3% of the population were Hispanic or Latino of any race. 8.0% were of German, 5.9% English, 5.4% American and 5.3% Irish ancestry according to Census 2000. 63.6% spoke English and 33.7% Spanish as their first language.

There were 36,155 households, out of which 40.2% had children under the age of 18 living with them, 60.9% were married couples living together, 12.2% had a female householder with no husband present, and 20.9% were non-families. 16.5% of all households were made up of individuals, and 7.7% had someone living alone who was 65 years of age or older. The average household size was 3.18 and the average family size was 3.52.

In the county, the population was spread out, with 29.6% under the age of 18, 9.9% from 18 to 24, 29.1% from 25 to 44, 20.4% from 45 to 64, and 11.0% who were 65 years of age or older. The median age was 33 years. For every 100 females there were 91.8 males. For every 100 females age 18 and over, there were 86.0 males.

The median income for a household in the county was $36,286, and the median income for a family was $39,226. Males had a median income of $33,658 versus $24,415 for females. The per capita income for the county was $14,682. 21.4% of the population and 15.9% of families were below the poverty line. Out of the total population, 28.6% of those under the age of 18 and 9.0% of those 65 and older were living below the poverty line.

Economy 

In the 1990s Mixtec farmworkers were a large presence in the southern part of the state, and were beginning to filter northwards here along with other Mexican indigenous agricultural laborers to work in the County's farms.

Education 
Madera County is mostly covered by the State Center Community College District centered on Fresno City College in Fresno. Other districts with territory within Madera County also include the West Hills Community College District and the Merced Community College District.

School districts include:

Unified:

 Chawanakee Unified School District
 Firebaugh-Las Deltas Unified School District
 Golden Valley Unified School District
 Madera Unified School District
 Yosemite Unified School District - Includes some sections zoned for K-12 and some for grades 9-12 only

Secondary:
 Chowchilla Union High School District

Elementary:

 Alview-Dairyland Union Elementary School District
 Bass Lake Joint Union Elementary School District
 Chowchilla Elementary School District
 Raymond-Knowles Union Elementary School District

Government, policing, and politics

Government
The Government of Madera County is mandated by the California Constitution to have a five-member Board of Supervisors elected to staggered four-year terms. The Board of Supervisors: District 1, Brett Frazier; District 2, David Rogers; District 3, Robert Poythress; District 4, Leticia Gonzalez; District 5, Tom Wheeler; and County Administrator, Jay Varney; and staff provide for voter registration and elections, law enforcement, jails, vital records, property records, tax collection, public health, roads, and social services for the entire county. It is the local government for all unincorporated areas. Other elected offices include the Sheriff, Tyson Pogue; District Attorney, Sally Orme Moreno; Assessor, Brian Glover (acting); Auditor-Controller, David Richstone; Treasurer-Tax Collector, Tracy Kennedy; and Clerk/Registrar of Voters-Recorder, Rebecca Martinez.

Policing

Madera County Sheriff's Office
The Sheriff's Office and staff provide court protection, jail administration, and coroner service for all of Madera County with its total population of approximately 156,000 residents. The Sheriff provides police patrol and detective services to the unincorporated areas of the county, which contain approximately 70,000 residents, or 45% of Madera County's total population. The Sheriff's main station and offices are in the City of Madera. There are two Sheriff's substations: Oakhurst, population 3,000, and The Madera Ranchos, population 12,000, both on Highway 41 to Yosemite National Park in the Sierras.

Municipal police departments
The municipal police departments within Madera County are Madera, the county seat, population 62,000, and Chowchilla, population 19,600.

Politics

Voter registration

Cities by population and voter registration

Overview 
Madera is a strongly Republican county in presidential and congressional elections. The last Democrat to win a majority in the county was Jimmy Carter in 1976.

 
 
 
 
 
 
 
 
 
 
 
 
 
 
 
 
 
 
 
 
 
 
 
 
 
 
 
 
 
 

On November 4, 2008, Madera County voted 73.4% for Proposition 8, which amended the California Constitution to define marriage as a union between one man and one woman.

The county is one of three counties in California to establish a separate department to deal with corrections, pursuant to California Government Code §23013, the Madera County Department of Corrections, along with Napa County and Santa Clara County.  The officers receive their powers under 831 and 831.5 of the California Penal Code.

Crime 

The following table includes the number of incidents reported and the rate per 1,000 persons for each type of offense.

Cities by population and crime rates

Attractions
The Chowchilla/Madera County Fairgrounds hosts the Chowchilla Junior Fair, founded in 1946, and the Chowchilla Western Stampede. It also houses the Chowchilla Speedway, a 1/3 mile dirt track, and the Associated Feed Pavilion, a covered arena. The venue hosts numerous horse events and auctions, a Spring Festival barbecue, and other public and private events.

Transportation

Major highways
  State Route 41
  State Route 49
  State Route 99
  State Route 145
  State Route 152
  State Route 233

Other roads
The eastern side of Madera County, which includes Devil's Postpile National Monument and part of Minaret Summit, is unconnected to the rest of Madera County by road. This only road into this area is Minaret Summit Road which becomes State Route 203 at the Mono County border, connecting this area to Mammoth Lakes. Red's Meadow Road is a further extension of this route.

The gap between Minaret Road (not to be confused with Minaret Summit Road), which runs northeast into the Sierras from North Fork, and the end of the Red's Meadow Road is less than 10 miles, and plans for a highway (or tunnel) connecting the Eastern Sierra and the San Joaquin Valley via Minaret Summit had often been discussed. An area southwest of Minaret Summit was not included in the Wilderness Act of 1964 in order to leave a corridor for this possibility. During his time as  Governor of California, Ronald Reagan made a horse packing trip into the area.  Afterward he supported  conservationists' efforts to prevent this highway. Reagan continued his efforts after being elected  President in 1980, and the area was eventually designated wilderness by the California Wilderness Act of 1984.

Public transportation
 Madera County Connection provides service between the cities of Madera and Chowchilla. Routes also run to eastern Madera County. A connection to Fresno can be made at Valley Children's Hospital near the county line.
 The cities of Madera and Chowchilla also have their own local, intracity transit services named Madera Metro and Chowchilla Area Transit, respectively.
 Greyhound buses and Amtrak trains stop in Madera.

Airports
 Madera Municipal Airport and Chowchilla Airport are general aviation airports.

Communities

Cities
 Chowchilla
 Madera (county seat)

Census-designated places

 Ahwahnee
 Bass Lake
 Bonadelle Ranchos
 Coarsegold
 Fairmead
 La Vina
 Madera Acres
 Madera Ranchos
 Nipinnawasee
North Fork
 Oakhurst
 Parksdale
 Parkwood
 Rolling Hills
 Yosemite Lakes

Unincorporated communities
 Knowles
 O'Neals
 Raymond
 Ripperdan
 Sugar Pine

Population ranking

The population ranking of the following table is based on the 2010 census of Madera County.

† county seat

See also 
 Sierra National Forest
 Nelder Grove
 Fresno Dome
 List of museums in the San Joaquin Valley
 List of school districts in Madera County, California
 Madera Community Hospital
 National Register of Historic Places listings in Madera County, California
 USS Madera County (LST-905)

Notes

References

External links
 
 Madera County GenWeb - Genealogy
 Madera County History—Transcription of 1933 document on the county's history
 Oakhurst Area Chamber of Commerce
 Yosemite Sierra Visitors Bureau
 Madera Tribune, newspaper for the western half of the county founded March 31, 1892
 Superior Court of Madera County
 Madera County Library
 Madera Community Hospital
 Madera Values Quarterly Magazine

 
California counties
San Joaquin Valley
1893 establishments in California
Populated places established in 1893
Majority-minority counties in California